Synaphe antennalis is a species of moth of the family Pyralidae described by Johan Christian Fabricius in 1794. It is found in Spain, France, Austria, Italy, the Czech Republic, Slovakia, Hungary, Croatia, Bosnia and Herzegovina, Romania, Bulgaria, North Macedonia, Albania, Ukraine, Russia and Turkey.

References

Pyralini
Moths described in 1794
Moths of Europe
Moths of Asia
Taxa named by Johan Christian Fabricius